Say What! is a live album released in 1986 by the Washington, D.C.-based go-go band Trouble Funk. The album was recorded live in London, England during the summer of 1986.

Track listing

Side A
"Gilly Intro" – 0:46  
"A-Groove" – 4:25  
"Funk By Numbers" – 3:22  
"Pump Me Up" – 8:32

Side B
"Let's Get Small" – 6:08  
"Percussion Solos" – 6:23  
"Drop the Bomb" – 6:34

Personnel
 Robert "Dyke" Reed – electric guitar, keyboards, vocals
 Tony Fisher – lead vocals, bass guitar
 James Avery –  keyboards, vocals
 Taylor Reed – trumpet, vocals
 Timothy "T-Bone" David – percussions, vocals
 MacCarey – drums, percussions
 Alonzo Robinson – percussions, vocals
 Dave Rudd – saxophone, vocal
 Dean Harris – trumpet, vocals
 Chester Davis – electric guitar

Critical reception
Say What! was ranked number 19 among the "Albums of the Year" for 1986 by NME.

References

External links
Say What! at Discogs

1986 live albums
4th & B'way Records albums
Trouble Funk albums
Island Records albums